Woko is a national park in New South Wales, Australia, 243 km north of Sydney.

The Woko National Park is characterized by a steep and ragged landscape. There are vast areas of rainforest, arid places with rocky outcroppings and groves of eucalyptus. The Manning River flows through the park and its riverside locations are used by picnickers and hikers.

The average elevation of the terrain is 497 meters. The average summer temperature is between 16.8 ° C and 25.9 ° C, and the winter temperature is between 20.1 ° C and 14.4 ° C.

Wildlife
The Woko National Park is a habitat for several species of birds and animals. The forests, grasslands and rocky regions of the park are home to birds like the lyrebird and the wedge-tailed eagle. A number of threatened species of animals live here, including the brush-tailed rock-wallaby.

See also
 Protected areas of New South Wales

References

National parks of New South Wales
Protected areas established in 1982
1982 establishments in Australia